Pagadala Niranjan (born 16 December 1984) is an Indian former cricketer. He played three first-class matches for Hyderabad between 2005 and 2006.

See also
 List of Hyderabad cricketers

References

External links
 

1984 births
Living people
Indian cricketers
Hyderabad cricketers
Cricketers from Hyderabad, India